The men's 4 × 400 metres relay event at the 1965 Summer Universiade was held at the People's Stadium in Budapest on 26 and 29 August 1965.

Results

Heats

Final

References

Athletics at the 1965 Summer Universiade
1965